State Route 616 (SR 616) is a north–south state highway in the northeastern portion of the U.S. state of Ohio.  The southern terminus of SR 616  is at a signalized intersection with SR 170 immediately south of US 224 in Poland.  The northern terminus of the state highway is at a signalized intersection that doubles as the eastern end of the concurrency of US 62, SR 7 and SR 304 in Hubbard.

Route description
Along its path, SR 616 passes through northeastern Mahoning County and southeastern Trumbull County.  No stretch of SR 616 is included within the National Highway System, a network of highways deemed most vital for the nation's economy, mobility and defense.

The section of SR 616 between US Route 422 and US Route 224, is considered a "principal arterial" highway, and is a "MAP-21" (Moving Ahead for Progress in the 21st century), to be potentially included within the NHS.

History
SR 616 was established in 1939.  From its inception, it has maintained the same Poland–Hubbard alignment that it utilizes today.  There have been no changes of major significance to the routing of SR 616 since it was designated.

Major intersections

References

616
Transportation in Mahoning County, Ohio
Transportation in Trumbull County, Ohio